Higham with West Close Booth is a civil parish in Pendle, Lancashire, England.  It contains 16 listed buildings that are recorded in the National Heritage List for England.  Of these, one is at Grade II*, the middle grade, and the others are at Grade II, the lowest grade.  The parish contains the village of Higham and surrounding countryside.  Most of the listed buildings are houses, farmhouses and farm buildings.  The other listed buildings consist of a public house, a church, a former school, and a war memorial.

Key

Buildings

References

Citations

Sources

Lists of listed buildings in Lancashire
Buildings and structures in the Borough of Pendle